Aksyon Ngayon (lit. Action Today) was a public service program aired on DZMM. Originally hosted by Ted Failon and Korina Sanchez, It premiered on August 5, 1991, and the show concluded on December 30, 2016. Julius Babao, alongside Zaldy Naguit, served as the final host. The program was formerly aired every weekdays from 11:00am-12:00nn with simulcast on The Filipino Channel worldwide.

History
On August 5, 1991, Aksyon Ngayon, the first ever program on AM radio devoted solely to public service was created. First anchored by Korina Sanchez and Ted Failon, Aksyon Ngayon immediately soared to the top of the ratings list. Because of the thousands of less-fortunate Kapamilyas flocking the station asking help from Aksyon Ngayon, the executives decided to create the DZMM Public Service Center, the first ever separate office exclusively created for public service by a local AM station.

In order for the program to reach public service to Filipinos worldwide, it changed its title into Aksyon Ngayon: Global Patrol in 2008.

In 2010, for the first time in Philippine radio history, the two stations DZMM and GMA Network's DZBB made a historical simulcast when they had two children asked for help to find the missing parents from Bohol on a rival program on DZMM Aksyon Ngayon but reunited through DZBB's program Aksyon Oro Mismo.

On January 11, 2011, Julius Babao joined the anchor chair, replacing David Oro. His arrival made the program revert to its debut title, Aksyon Ngayon, and moved its timeslot from 1:30pm–2:30pm to 11:00am-12:00nn.

In 2016, Kaye Dacer announced her resignation as anchor of the program due to her current political stand and conflict of interests. Her family owned a major controlling stake in 8TriMedia Broadcasting Network, which is a blocktimer of DZRJ 810 AM, leaving Babao to go solo on the final months of the program.

On December 30, 2016, Aksyon Ngayon aired its final episode. On January 2, 2017, the show was succeeded by ABS-CBN Lingkod Kapamilya sa DZMM and is initally hosted by Babao and Bernadette Sembrano (later replaced by Edric Calma on January 3, 2022 and Winnie Cordero on January 30, 2023). However, the Aksyon Ngayon name still continued as a segment of the new program as Aksyon Ngayon sa Lingkod Kapamilya.

Format
Action is what this Catholic Mass Media Awards (CMMA) and KBP Golden Dove Award Best Public Service/Affairs Program recipient gives to the problems and concerns of our less fortunate Kapamilyas through its Aksyon Ngayon Center that operates for eight hours, five days a week. During its broadcast, those in need of immediate government assistance can directly communicate with concerned agencies (like SSS, GSIS, LTO, and others) in person or via telephone. The program also links those who need help and donors while its on-air bulletin, "Panawagang Bayan," airs people's concerns— from lost possessions to finding missing loved ones.

Like other DZMM programs, Radyo Patrol reports can interrupt the program when a story breaks.

Former anchors
Jake Maderazo
Emiliano R. Recometa
Mel Tiangco 
Jay Sonza
Ted Failon
Korina Sanchez
Joey Lina
Alfredo Lim
Fr. Tito Caluag
David Oro

Awards
Public Service Award, for Babao and Dacer in the 63rd FAMAS Awards.

See also
ABS-CBN News and Current Affairs
DZMM
DZMM TeleRadyo
Wanted sa Radyo

References

Philippine radio programs
1991 radio programme debuts
2016 radio programme endings
ABS-CBN News and Current Affairs shows